Marquis is a family name (surname) as well as a given name. It derives from the hereditary title of nobility Marquis. Notable people with the name include:

Surname
 Albert Nelson Marquis (1855–1943), American publisher
 André Marquis (1883–1957), Vichy French admiral
 Arnold Marquis (1921–1990), German actor and voice talent
 Bob Marquis (1924–2007), American professional baseball player
 Brian Marquis (born 1981), American singer-songwriter
 Carl Marquis, Canadian paralympic athlete
 Craig Marquis (born 1985), American poker player
 Daniel Marquis (1829–1879), Australian portrait photographer

 Don Marquis (1878–1937), American writer, poet, and journalist
 Don Marquis (philosopher) (born 1935), American philosopher and bioethicist
 Donald Marquis (psychologist) (1908–1973), American psychologist
 Ellaisa Marquis (born 1991), international football player from Saint Lucia
 Eugène Marquis (1901–1994), Canadian politician, judge and lawyer
 Gail Marquis (born 1954), American former basketball player
 Herman Marquis, Jamaican saxophone musician
 Jason Marquis (born 1978), American Major League Baseball All Star pitcher
 Jerry Marquis (born 1956), former NASCAR driver
 Jim Marquis (1900–1992), Major League Baseball pitcher
 John Marquis (born 1992), English professional footballer
 Joshua Marquis (born 1952), American attorney and politician
 Juliette Marquis (born 1980), Ukrainian-born American actress, model, and former ballerina
 Louis Marquis (born 1929), Swiss racewalker
 Richard Marquis (born 1945), American glass artist
 Margaret Marquis (born 1917), Canadian-American film actress
 Marie-Noelle Marquis (born 1979), French-Canadian actress
 Sarah Marquis (born 1972), Swiss explorer
 Thomas Bailey Marquis (1869–1935), American physician, writer, historian, and ethnologist

Given name
 Marquis Bundy (born 1994), American football player
 Marquis Calmes (1755–1834), American military leader
 Marquis Floyd (born 1980), American football player
 Marquis Grissom (born 1967), American baseball player
 Marquis Hainse, Commander of the Canadian Army
 Marquis Hayes (born 1998), American football player
 Marquis Haynes (born 1993), American football player
 Marquis Jackson (born 1990), American football player
 Marquis James (1891–1955), American journalist and author
 Marquis Johnson (born 1988), American football player
 Marquis Lucas (born 1993), American football player
 Marquis Mathieu (born 1973), professional ice hockey player
 Marquis Maze (born 1988), American football player
 Marquis Pleasant (born 1965), former American football player
 Marquis Smith (born 1975), former American football player
 Marquis Walker (born 1972), former an American football player
 Marquis Lafayette Wood (1829–1893), American Methodist minister and president of Trinity College

See also
 Marques (disambiguation), includes a list of people with given name Marques
 Marquese, given name
 Marcus (name), given name and surname

References